Moita Bonita is a municipality located in the Brazilian state of Sergipe. Moita Bonita has a population density of 120 inhabitants per square kilometer. Riachuelo borders the municipalities of Itabaiana, Ribeirópolis, Nossa Senhora das Dores, Santa Rosa de Lima, and Malhador, all within the state of Sergipe.

References

Municipalities in Sergipe
Populated places established in 1963